Acronychia wilcoxiana, commonly known as silver aspen, doughwood, snowwood or mushyberry, is a species of small rainforest tree that is endemic to eastern Australia. It has simple, elliptical to egg-shaped leaves with the narrower end towards the base, relatively large groups of whitish flowers in leaf axils and broadly oval to more or less spherical, white fruit.

Description

Taxonomy
The silver aspen was first formally described in 1875 by Ferdinand von Mueller who gave it the name Pleiococca wilcoxiana and published the description in Fragmenta phytographiae Australiae. In 1974 Thomas Hartley changed the name to Acronychia wilcoxiana in the Journal of the Arnold Arboretum. The species name honours James Fowler Wilcox, a 19th-century collector of birds and plants in northern New South Wales.

Distribution and habitat
Acronychia wilcoxiana grows in rainforest, mostly between Fraser Island in south-east Queensland and Gosford in central-eastern New South Wales and from sea level to an altitude of  but a small population of about eight mature trees has been recorded at Primbee in the Illawarra district.

Ecology
The fruit of A. wilcoxiana are eaten by rainforest birds, including the wompoo fruit-dove.

Conservation status
Silver aspen is listed as of "least concern" under the Queensland Government Nature Conservation Act 1992.

Use in horticulture
Germination from seed is not easy, however, the removal of the fleshy aril from the seed will improve results. Seeds may germinate after 6 to 12 months.

References

wilcoxiana
Trees of Australia
Flora of New South Wales
Flora of Queensland
Sapindales of Australia
Plants described in 1875
Taxa named by Ferdinand von Mueller